Angelina Camarillo Ramos (born 1976) is an American singer from Union City, California. Angelina is best known for her 1996 hit song "Release Me", which reached No. 52 on the Billboard Hot 100.

After her brother Daniel was killed in 2006, Angelina stopped writing songs. She still toured on the dance music circuit for a while after that, eventually leaving the entertainment industry altogether to become a schoolteacher in East San Jose.

Her brother Daniel Camarillo has a memorial in his name at the Charles F. Kennedy Park in their hometown of Union City, CA.

Discography

References

External links
 http://www.discogs.com/artist/Angelina
 
 http://www.allmusic.com/artist/angelina-p204029/charts-awards/billboard-singles
 http://www.billboard.com/artists/top-100
 http://www.allmusic.com/album/angelina-mw0000023329/awards

American freestyle musicians
1976 births
Living people
People from Union City, California
Musicians from the San Francisco Bay Area
Singers from California
21st-century American women singers
21st-century American singers